Handrahan is a surname of Irish origin. Notable people with the surname include:

Alf Handrahan (born 1949), Canadian ice hockey player in World Hockey Association
Vern Handrahan (1936–2016), Canadian pitcher in Major League Baseball

See also
Hanrahan

References

Surnames of Irish origin
Anglicised Irish-language surnames